The 1939 Tour of Flanders was held in 1939.

General classification

Final general classification

Notes

References
Résultats sur siteducyclisme.net
Résultats sur cyclebase.nl
Résultats sur les-sports.info

External links
 

Tour of Flanders
1939 in road cycling
1939 in Belgian sport